Faisal Daoud is a Lebanese Druze politician. He was born in 1954. Daoud served as general secretary of the Lebanese Arab Struggle Movement between 1986 and 2014.

He studied Arabic literature at the Lebanese University. He was inducted to parliament in 1991, replacing his father Salim Daoud. He was elected to parliament in the 1992, 1996 and 2000 elections.

He stood as the March 8 Alliance candidate for the Druze seat in West Bekaa-Rachaya in the 2009 Lebanese general election, obtaining 28,026 votes (43.4%).

References

1954 births
Living people
Lebanese politicians
Lebanese Druze
Lebanese Arab nationalists